Cyclamen persicum, the Persian cyclamen, is a species of flowering herbaceous perennial plant growing from a tuber, native to rocky hillsides, shrubland, and woodland up to  above sea level, from south-central Turkey to Lebanon-Syria and the Palestine region.  It also grows in Algeria and Tunisia and on the Greek islands of Rhodes, Karpathos, and Crete, where it may have been introduced by monks. Cultivars of this species are the commonly seen florist's cyclamen.

Description
Wild plants have heart-shaped, fleshy leaves, up to  usually green with lighter markings on the upper surface. The leaf underside may be pale green or reddish. The leaf margin is slightly thickened and usually serrated. As a storage and persistence organ, C. persicum forms a perennial hypocotyl tuber. It arises solely through a thickening of the hypocotyl, the shoot axis area between the root neck and the first cotyledon. The rounded, slightly flattened tuber is about 4 to 15 cm or more in diameter. It is of corky consistency. The roots spring from the underside, and the tops of the spirally arranged, long-stalked leaves of the plant spring from the top.

Flowers
Flowers bloom from winter to spring (var. persicum) or in autumn (var. autumnale) and have 5 small sepals and 5 upswept petals, usually white to pale pink with a band of deep pink to magenta at the base. Cyclamen carry on individual stems standing flowers that hang down but whose petals are bent strongly upwards. In the species, flowers are sweetly scented, but the scent has been lost in cultivated forms.

Fruit
After pollination, the flower stem curls downwards slightly as the pod develops, but does not coil as in other cyclamens. Plants go dormant in summer. The fruits are capsules, which are sunk into the ground with increasing maturity, by waxing and curling of the stem. The capsules only open when they are in the ground.

Range
The natural range of Cyclamen persicum extends from North Africa across West Asia to Southeast Europe. In particular, the following occurrences are documented: In North Africa, the species is represented in the northern and eastern parts of Algeria and in northern Tunisia. In Western Asia, stocks were confirmed in Cyprus, Israel, Jordan, western Syria and western Turkey. In the eastern part of Greece, the only deposits in Europe could be occupied. 

The preferred growing sites include pine forests, oak thickets and open rocky slopes mostly on calcareous soils up to an altitude of 1000 meters. In the summer months, the high temperature and the dryness lead to the death of the aerial plant parts. The plants outlast the dry season in their shallow subterranean tubers. They then drift off again at the beginning of the colder season.

Varieties and forms
There are two natural varieties and several named forms, distinguished by flowering time and predominant petal color.
C. persicum var. persicum (winter- and spring-flowering — all of range)
C. persicum var. persicum f. persicum (white to pale pink)
C. persicum var. persicum f. albidum (pure white)
C. persicum var. persicum f. roseum (rose-pink)
C. persicum var. persicum f. puniceum (red to carmine)
C. persicum var. autumnale (autumn-flowering)

Cultivars

The following is a selection of cultivars. All are frost-tender, and best grown under glass in temperate regions:

'Concerto Apollo'
'Halios Bright Fuchsia'
'Halios Violet'
'Halios White'
'Laser Rose'
'Laser Salmon with Eye'
'Laser Scarlet'
'Laser White'
'Miracle Deep Rose'
'Miracle Scarlet' 
'Miracle White'
'Sierra Fuchsia'
'Sierra Light Purple' 
'Sierra Pink with Eye'
'Sierra Scarlet'
'Sierra White with Eye'

Uses
This species probably arrived in Paris before its first mention in 1620. Certainly, it has been cultivated since 1731 in France. The start of the variety breeding is dated to the 1860s, starting from England. The different varieties of it were created exclusively by breeding with variants of the wild species. An introgression of other species has not occurred. 

Cyclamen persicum has a dark-brown tuberous root which is semi-poisonous. In some cultures, the tubers were used in making soap, as they generate a lather when mixed with water. The Bedouins of Mandate Palestine used to collect the root, and after grating it, would mix it with lime and sprinkle it over the surface of lakes or other large bodies of water known to contain fish. These poisonous mixtures would stun fish, which would then come to the surface and be collected by the fishermen. Such methods, as well as fishing with explosives, which came into use in the early 20th century, were banned by the British Mandate authorities.

Cyclamen are propagated by seeds. Seeds should be very fresh, seeds will not last long. Cyclamen are dark germs, so the seed is covered with soil and set up dark. The germination period is 20 to 30 days. After germination, the seed boxes are highlighted. With good care, the plants can live to about 20 to 30 years old.

Gallery

References

External links

Cyclamen Society

persicum
Flora of Western Asia
Flora of North Africa
House plants
Garden plants of Asia
Garden plants of Europe
Plants described in 1768
Taxa named by Philip Miller
Poisonous plants